Arisarum simorrhinum is species of flowering plant of the family Araceae. It is native to the western Mediterranean Basin (Iberian Peninsula and northwest Maghreb).

Description
It has sagittate leaves, with a long petiole.

The spadix has a sterile terminal part, arched in the upper half and unequal to the lower part, and is situated within the spathe.

Fruit is composed of multiple berries (2-8), greenish and not very fleshy,  and 1 to 12 seeds per berry.

Distribution and habitat
Arisarum simorrhinum is native to most of Portugal, western Spain, Morocco and northwestern Algeria. Records from the Canary Islands, Balearic Islands, Madeira and Tunisia are erroneous due to taxonomic confusion with A. vulgare subsp. subexsertum.

References

Aroideae
Flora of Portugal